Ponjassery is a town in Vengola Village in Kunnathunad Taluk of Ernakulam district in the Indian state of Kerala. It is on Aluva-Munnar Highway(SH-16) between Perumbavoor and Aluva. There are three junctions in Ponjassery, one is the road to Vengola and other one is to Kizhakkambalam another one is  Mudikkal .Ponjassery is coming under the administration of Vengola Gram Panjayath. Ponjassery is the Ward No.  1 of Vengola Gram Panjayath. Ponjassery is known for its secular feature.

Religious places
1)Poomala Fakir Sainudheen Masjid, Chundamalapuram
2)Misbahul Hudha Masjid,  MH Kavala
3)Ponjassery Thaikkaav 
4)Nayarupeedika Juma Masjid
5)Ponjassery Subhramanya Swamy Kshethram
7)Aarogyamatha Roman Catholic Church
8)Vengola Hydrose Muslim Jamath
9)Chembarathukunnu Jamaath Masjid

Hospitals
1. V M J Hospital, West Vengola, Hydrose Nagar
2. Bharath Hospital, Chembarakky
3.Rajagiri Hospital.

Location

References 

Cities and towns in Ernakulam district